Ideraway Creek Railway Bridge is a heritage-listed railway bridge at Mungar - Monto Line, Ideraway, North Burnett Region, Queensland, Australia. It was designed by William Pagan and built from 1906 to 1907 using day labour. It was added to the Queensland Heritage Register on 21 October 1992.

History 
Construction of the section of railway from Wetheron to Gayndah began in March 1906 using day labour. Completion of the line was delayed building two bridges of special designs over gorges between Ideraway and Gayndah. The Ideraway Creek Railway Bridge was designed and drawings signed by Chief Engineer, William Pagan, on 10 December 1906. The extension was opened for traffic on 16 December 1907. The other bridge is the Steep Rocky Creek Railway Bridge.

Description 
The Ideraway Creek bridge is one of the most unusual bridges in Australia. It demonstrates the economic re-use of part of the erection truss used to build the Burdekin River Rail Bridge at Macrossan between Townsville and Charters Towers opened in 1899. The pinned construction and multiple members of the truss were originally designed for rapid assembly and disassembly.

The bridge work consists of:
 Wetheron embankment
  timber longitudinals, timber trestle, common timber trestle
  timber longitudinals, common timber trestle, common concrete pier
  deck-type pin-jointed fishbelly truss (ex Burdekin River bridge, Macrossan) with transom tops, six sets of two steel longitudinals, common concrete piers
  timber longitudinals, common concrete pier, common timber trestle
  timber longitudinals, common timber trestle, timber trestle
 Gayndah embankment

Heritage listing 
Ideraway Creek Railway Bridge was listed on the Queensland Heritage Register on 21 October 1992 having satisfied the following criteria.

The place is important in demonstrating the evolution or pattern of Queensland's history.

The deck-type pin-jointed fishbelly truss main span is unique in Australia. It is the only bridge of its type in Queensland and therefore the longest span of its type in Queensland. It innovatively re-uses the falsework of the Burdekin River Bridge at Macrossan of 1899. (This falsework had been re-used on two separate bridges prior to this one).

The bridge demonstrates the economies employed in the construction of Queensland's railways.

The place demonstrates rare, uncommon or endangered aspects of Queensland's cultural heritage.

The deck-type pin-jointed fishbelly truss main span is unique in Australia. It is the only bridge of its type in Queensland and therefore the longest span of its type in Queensland.

The place is important in demonstrating a high degree of creative or technical achievement at a particular period.

It innovatively re-uses the falsework of the Burdekin River Bridge at Macrossan of 1899 (This falsework had been re-used on two separate bridges prior to this one). The bridge demonstrates the economies employed in the construction of Queensland's railways.

The Official Register of Engineering Heritage Markers listed

 Degilbo-Mundubbera Railway Bridges in October 2016.  A total of 12 bridges that are situated on the Mungar Junction to Monto railway line, including the Ideraway Creek Railway Bridge, are recognized with one Engineering Heritage Marker representing the “best example of a collection of historic railway bridges in Australia”.

References

Attribution

External links 

Queensland Heritage Register
Articles incorporating text from the Queensland Heritage Register
North Burnett Region
1907 establishments in Australia
Railway bridges in Queensland
Truss bridges in Australia